The Jeddah Chamber of Commerce & Industry (JCCI) is the chamber of commerce in the city of Jeddah, Saudi Arabia.

JCCI is one of the oldest business and services organizations in Saudi Arabia. It was established by a royal decree dated January 1946. Since then, with the efforts of 20 sessions of the Board of Directors, the chamber has been serving the national economy and business community, contributing to its development and progress.

See also
Jeddah Economic Forum
Jeddah
List of company registers

References

External links
JCCI website (in English)

1946 establishments in Saudi Arabia
Organizations established in 1946
Organisations based in Jeddah
Economy of Jeddah
Chambers of commerce